A road verge is a strip of grass or plants, and sometimes also trees, located between a roadway (carriageway) and a sidewalk (pavement). Verges are known by dozens of other names, often quite regional; see Terminology below.

The land is often public property, with maintenance usually being a municipal responsibility. Some municipal authorities, however, require that abutting property owners maintain their respective verge areas, as well as the adjunct footpaths or sidewalks.

Benefits include visual aesthetics, increased safety and comfort of sidewalk users, protection from spray from passing vehicles, and a space for benches, bus shelters, street lights, and other public amenities. Verges are also often part of sustainability for water conservation or the management of urban runoff and water pollution and can provide useful wildlife habitat. Snow that has been ploughed off the street in colder climates often is stored in the area of the verge by default.

In the British Isles, verges are the last location of habitats for a range of flora. 

The main disadvantage of a road verge is that the right-of-way must be wider, increasing the cost of the road. In some localities, a wider verge offers opportunity for later road widening, should the traffic usage of a road demand this. For this reason, footpaths are usually sited a significant distance from the curb.

Sustainable urban and landscape design

In urban and suburban areas, urban runoff from private and civic properties can be guided by grading and bioswales for rainwater harvesting collection and bioretention within the "tree-lawn" – parkway zone in rain gardens. This is done for reducing runoff of rain and domestic water: for their carrying waterborne pollution off-site into storm drains and sewer systems; and for the groundwater recharge of aquifers.

In some cities, such as Santa Monica, California, city code mandates specify: Parkways, the area between the outside edge of the sidewalk and the inside edge of the curb which are a component of the Public Right of Way (PROW) – that the landscaping should require little or no irrigation and the area produce no runoff.

For Santa Monica, another reason for this use of "tree-lawns" is to reduce current beach and Santa Monica Bay ocean pollution that is measurably higher at city outfalls. New construction and remodeling projects needing building permits require that landscape design submittals include garden design plans showing the means of compliance.

In some cities and counties, such as Portland, Oregon, street and highway departments are regrading and planting rain gardens in road verges to reduce boulevard and highway runoff. This practice can be useful in areas with either independent Storm sewers or combined storm and sanitary sewers, reducing the frequency of pollution, treatment costs, and released overflows of untreated sewage into rivers and oceans during rainstorms.

Rural roadsides
In some countries, the road verge can be a corridor of vegetation that remains after adjacent land has been cleared. Considerable effort in supporting conservation of the remnant vegetation is prevalent in Australia, where significant tracts of land are managed as part of the roadside conservation strategies by government agencies.

Gallery

Terminology
The term verge has many synonyms and dialectal differences. Some dialects and idiolects lack a specific term for this area, instead using a circumlocution.

Terms used include:

 Berm: Pennsylvania, northern Indiana, Ohio, Michigan, Wisconsin, New Zealand
 Besidewalk
 Boulevard: Detroit, Michigan; North Dakota; Minnesota; Iowa; Illinois; Ohio; Wisconsin; United States Upper Midwest; Winnipeg, and western Canada; Toronto, Ontario; Markham, Ontario; Kitchener, Ontario
 Boulevard strip: U.S. Upper Midwest
 Common: New England, generally describes a large strip of grass. Also refers to park-like common-use green spaces in small town centers.
 Curb lawn: Kalamazoo, Michigan; Elyria, Ohio; Miami County, Ohio; Greenville, South Carolina
 Curb strip: New Jersey, New York, North Carolina, Florida, Ohio, Indiana, Massachusetts, Michigan, Iowa, Kansas, Nebraska, Oregon, Washington
 Devil strip or devilstrip: Akron, Ohio; Northeast Ohio. This term was once used more widely to refer to the space between tracks on a streetcar line, a space not wide enough to stand in as cars passed.
 Drivestrip or Drive Strip
 Easement
 Extension lawn: Ann Arbor, Michigan
 Furniture zone, also landscape zone: a term used by urban planners, indicating its suitability for "street furniture" such as utility poles and fire hydrants, as well as trees or planters
 Grass bay: New Jersey
 Grassplot: East Coast of the United States, Pennsylvania
 Hellstrip
 Island strip: Long Island, New York
Long acre – a traditional term for wide grassy road verges, used by grazing herds or flocks moving from place to place
 Median: Washington, Oregon
 Mow strip: SF East Bay Area Northern California 
 Nature strip: Australia
 Neutral ground: U.S. Gulf states
 Park strip: Ohio
 Parking: Illinois, Iowa, Western United States
 Parking strip: Washington, Oregon, Utah, much of California
 Parkrow: Iowa, Oregon
 Parkway: Grand Rapids, Michigan; Greater Los Angeles; San Francisco Bay Area; West Coast of the United States; Casper, Wyoming; Ohio; Illinois; Missouri; Florida; Texas
 Parkway strip: Austin, Texas; Fort Collins, Colorado
 Planter zone: SmartCode/New Urbanist terminology
 Planting strip: Berkeley, California, Seattle, Washington
 Right-of-way: Wisconsin, Illinois
 Road allowance: Ottawa, Canada
 Road verge: Australia
 Roadside: Australia
 Shoulder 
 Sidewalk lawn: Georgia
 Sidewalk plot: Virginia, Maryland, Indiana, Tennessee
 Sidewalk strip: California, Oregon, Utah, Washington
 Sidewalk taint: Central Indiana
 Street lawn: Ohio
 Subway: Western New York
 Swale: South Florida
 Terrace: U.S. Great Lakes region, Missouri
 Tree belt: Massachusetts
 Tree box: Washington, DC
 Tree lawn or treelawn: Ohio, Indiana, New York, and elsewhere
 Verge: UK, New Zealand, South Africa Western Australia

See also

 :Category:Environmental conservation
 Central reservation
 Roadside conservation
 Shoulder (road)
 Urban forestry

References

External links

 Parkway with xeric garden photographs
 Devil Strips – term's use and lore

Urban studies and planning terminology
Hydrology and urban planning
Environmental design
Water conservation
Types of garden